Date With Darkness is a spy novel by Donald Hamilton, his first published novel.

Plot summary
Navy Lieutenant Philip Branch is on leave in New York City when he becomes snared in a glamour girl's schemes.

Publication history
1947, USA, Rinehart, hardcover
1950, USA, Dell, Mapback #375, paperback
1951, UK, Allan Wingate, hardcover

External links
 Review by James Reasoner

1947 American novels
American spy novels
Novels by Donald Hamilton
Novels set in New York City
1947 debut novels